TAT Nigeria was a Nigerian virtual charter airline based at Murtala Muhammed International Airport in Lagos. It specialized in Christian pilgrim tours mainly to Israel.

TAT Nigeria did not have its own fleet and chartered aircraft from other operators, which made it, at the time of its demise, a virtual airline, economically speaking. They previously used an Airbus A330-300 and Boeing 747-400.

References

External links

Defunct airlines of Nigeria
Defunct companies based in Lagos